Men at Lunch is a 2012 Irish language documentary on the history behind the 1932 Lunch atop a Skyscraper photograph, its Irish connections, and the story of immigration in New York at the turn of the century. It was directed by Seán Ó Cualáin, produced by his brother, Éamonn Ó Cualáin, and narrated by Fionnula Flanagan. It premiered at the Galway Film Fleadh film festival in 2012.

Accolades
 Special Irish Language Award - 10th Irish Film & Television Awards

References

External links
 

Irish documentary films
Irish-language films
English-language Irish films
Documentary films about New York City
Documentary films about photography
Documentary films about immigration to the United States